The Crescent may refer to:

 The Crescent (film) (2017)
 The Crescent (department store), a former department store chain that was headquartered in Spokane, Washington
The Crescent (English band), an English indie band
 The Crescent (Dallas), a landmark office building in Dallas, Texas
 The Crescent (Cincinnati, Ohio), listed on the National Register of Historic Places
 The Crescent (Valdosta, Georgia), listed on the NRHP in Georgia
 The Crescent, part of the Downtown Ossining Historic District, New York
 The Crescent (Birmingham), a defunct housing development and street in Birmingham, England.
 The Crescent (Limerick), a street in Limerick, Ireland
 Crescent Arts Centre, Belfast, Northern Ireland
 The Crescent, Wisbech, Isle of Ely, Cambridgeshire.

See also
The Fertile Crescent, crescent-shaped region in Western Asia, and the Nile Valley and Nile Delta of northeast Africa
 The Old Crescent, Bloomington, Indiana, listed on the NRHP in Indiana
Royal Crescent
Crescent (disambiguation)